The India national cricket team represents India in international cricket and is a full member of the International Cricket Council with Test and One Day International (ODI) status. They first competed in international cricket in 1932, when they played against England in a three-day Test match; England won the match by 158 runs. India's first Test series as an independent country was against Australia.  They secured their first Test win against England in 1952 at Madras Cricket Club Ground. , India have played 533 Test matches; they have won 150 matches, lost 165 matches, and 217 matches were drawn with one being tied. India played their first ODI match against England in 1974, but registered their first win against East Africa in 1975. , India have played 968 ODI matches, winning 502 matches and losing 417; 9 matches were tied and 40 matches had no result. They also won the 1983 and 2011 Cricket World Cups, along with the 2002 and the 2013 ICC Champions Trophy.  India played their first Twenty20 International (T20I) against South Africa in 2006, winning the match by six wickets, and won the inaugural ICC World Twenty20 in 2007. , they have played 115 T20I matches and won 70 of them; 41 were lost, with one being tied and three having no result.

India have faced ten teams in Test cricket, with their most frequent opponent being England, against whom they have played 122 matches. India have registered more wins against Australia than against any other team, with 28. In ODI matches, India have played against 19 teams. They have played against Sri Lanka more frequently in ODI matches, with a winning percentage of 61.56 in 90 out of 158 matches. India have defeated Sri Lanka on 90 occasions, which is their best record in ODIs. The team have played 13 countries in T20Is, and have played 20 matches with Australia. They also have recorded the most victories against Australia , defeating them in eleven matches.

Key

Test Cricket

One Day International

Twenty20 International

Notes

References

Cricket records and statistics